
Edmund Hamer Broadbent (15 June 1861  – 28 June 1945) was a Christian missionary and author. Born in Crumpsall, Lancashire, England, Broadbent operated under the auspices of the Plymouth Brethren movement.

His missionary work from 1900 into the 1920s took him to Austria, Belgium, Egypt, Germany, Poland, Russia, Turkey, the Baltic states, North and South America, and Uzbekistan. He spoke fluent French and German and could speak some Russian.

Broadbent's book, The Pilgrim Church, first published in 1931, is an alternative history of the church, unrecorded by secular history. It covers the history of many small churches throughout the ages that have attempted to follow the New Testament church pattern, what he regarded as the success of those that followed the pattern laid out by the apostles and the consequences to the churches that fell away from the pattern. He looks broadly at many groups such as the Paulicians, the Bogomils, the Nestorians, the Waldensians, the Anabaptists, the Hutterites, the Methodists, the Russian Mennonites and the Mennonite Brethren. He classified early primitive churches to Anabaptist, and classified the Moravian Brethren as the historical roots to the later Brethren Movement.

John Bjorlie wrote that Broadbent was a "tidy-looking English gentleman with a bookish side who discovered ways of slipping into and out of countries that others just assumed were 'closed doors.' He was not a big man, and his pleasant, easygoing manner would not have conjured in your mind the picture of the fearless missionary."

Broadbent married Dora Holiday in Bradford in 1891, and together they had eight children.

Broadbent died in Stoke-on-Trent on 28 June 1945.

Bibliography
 The Pilgrim Church 
 The Pilgrim Church  (Gospel Folio Press, 2009)
 Jeremiah: The Book of the Prophet Jeremiah

See also 
 Baptist successionism

References

External links
 The Pilgrim Church on Project Gutenberg Australia
 The Pilgrim Church, published by Gospel Folio Press
 Broadbent biography on the Plymouth Brethren website

1861 births
1945 deaths
British Plymouth Brethren
Historians of Christianity
English Protestant missionaries
Protestant missionaries in Austria
Protestant missionaries in Belgium
Protestant missionaries in Egypt
Protestant missionaries in Germany
Protestant missionaries in Poland
Protestant missionaries in Russia
Protestant missionaries in Turkey
Protestant missionaries in Estonia
Protestant missionaries in Latvia
Protestant missionaries in Lithuania
Protestant missionaries in Uzbekistan
Protestant missionaries in the Ottoman Empire
British historians of religion